İlhan Baran (born 1934 in Artvin) is a Turkish composer. 

Baran studied double bass and was a composition student of Ahmed Adnan Saygun at Ankara State Conservatory, graduating in 1960. He continued his studies in France at École Normale de Musique de Paris with Henri Dutilleux and Maurice Ohana. After returning to Turkey, he taught composition at the Ankara State Conservatory from 1964 to 2000.

Selected works
Orchestra
 Töresel Çeşitlemeler (Modal Variations) (1980)

Chamber music
 Bir Bölümlü Sonatina (Sonatina in One Movement) for violin (or viola, or cello) and piano (1965)
 Yaylı Çalgılar Dördülü (String Quartet)
 Demet (Miracles) for flute, oboe, clarinet, horn and bassoon (1966–1967)
 Dönüşümler (Transformations) for violin, cello and piano (1975)
 Uygulamalar (Applications), Volumes I & II for double bass and piano
 Dört Zeybek (4 Zeybek Dances) for double bass and piano
 Dört Parça (4 Pieces) for 2 flutes

Keyboard
 Çocuk Parçaları (Children's Pieces) for piano or harpsichord (1984)
 Küçük Süit (Junior Suite) for piano
 Üç Soyut Dans (3 Abstract Dances) for piano
 Üç Bagatel (3 Bagatelles) for piano (1974)
 İki Sesli Sonatına (2 Audio Sonatinas) for piano
 Siyah Beyaz (Black and White) for piano
 Mavi Anadolu (Blue Anatolia) for piano (1999)

 Choral
 Eylül Sonu (End of September) for mixed chorus
 Ezgi Demeti for mixed chorus
 Şarkılar (Songs) for mixed chorus

References

1934 births
Living people
Turkish classical composers
Turkish classical double-bassists
Ankara State Conservatory alumni
Academic staff of Ankara State Conservatory
Academic staff of Hacettepe University Ankara State Conservatory
École Normale de Musique de Paris alumni
People from Artvin
Male classical composers
21st-century double-bassists
Male double-bassists
20th-century double-bassists
20th-century classical composers
21st-century classical composers
20th-century male musicians
21st-century male musicians